Clifford Glen Rozier (October 31, 1972 - July 6, 2018) was an American professional basketball player. He played four seasons in the National Basketball Association (NBA) following an All-American college career for the Louisville Cardinals.

Rozier was named Florida Mr. Basketball. He played college basketball at the University of North Carolina and the University of Louisville. As a senior at Louisville, Rozier averaged 18.1 points and 11.1 rebounds a game. He was selected by the Golden State Warriors in the first round (16th pick overall) of the 1994 NBA draft. Rozier played for the Warriors, Toronto Raptors and Minnesota Timberwolves in his four NBA seasons. His best season as a pro came during his rookie year with the Warriors, when he appeared in 66 games averaging 6.8 points per game. Over the course of his career, he played in 173 NBA games.

In 2000, he played in the United States Basketball League with the Brevard Blue Ducks.

Rozier died at age 45 following a heart attack on July 6, 2018.

References

External links
College & NBA stats @ basketballreference.com

1972 births
2018 deaths
20th-century African-American sportspeople
21st-century African-American sportspeople
African-American basketball players
All-American college men's basketball players
American expatriate basketball people in Canada
American expatriate basketball people in Spain
American men's basketball players
Basketball players from Florida
Golden State Warriors draft picks
Golden State Warriors players
Liga ACB players
Louisville Cardinals men's basketball players
McDonald's High School All-Americans
Minnesota Timberwolves players
North Carolina Tar Heels men's basketball players
Parade High School All-Americans (boys' basketball)
Power forwards (basketball)
Quad City Thunder players
Sportspeople from Bradenton, Florida
Toronto Raptors players
Valencia Basket players